The 2016–17 FAI Intermediate Cup, also known as the 2016–17 Umbro FAI Intermediate Cup for sponsorship reasons, is the 90th season of the national Intermediate Football competition of the Republic of Ireland. The sixteen teams that reach the Fourth Round will qualify for the 2017 FAI Cup.

First round
Intermediate teams from the Munster Senior League, Leinster Senior League, and the Ulster Senior League entered in this round. The First Round was regionalised, so teams from the Munster Senior League played each other, teams from the Leinster Senior League played each other and teams from the Ulster Senior League played each other on a knockout basis. The draw was made on 7 September 2016 with games played on 16,17,18,21 and 25 September 2016.

Munster

Byes:
 Ballinhassig A.F.C.
 Mayfield United
 Castleview A.F.C.
 Passage A.F.C.
 Douglas Hall A.F.C.
 Riverstown F.C.
 Everton A.F.C.
 St Mary's A.F.C.
 Kilreen Celtic F.C.
 Wilton United F.C.
 Leeside A.F.C.

Leinster

Byes:
 Arklow Town
 Inchicore Athletic F.C.
 Ballymun United F.C.
 Liffey Wanderers
 Bangor Celtic
 Lucan United F.C.
 Beggsboro A.F.C.
 Malahide United
 Celbridge Town F.C.
 Portmarnock A.F.C.
 Cherry Orchard
 Sacred Heart F.C.
 Crumlin United
 Shamrock Bhoys F.C.
 Drumcondra F.C.
 Skerries Town F.C.
 St.John Bosco F.C.
 Dunboyne A.F.C.
 St. Patrick's C.Y.F.C.
 Edenderry Town
 St James Gate F.C.
 Firhouse Clover F.C.
 T.E.K. United
 Greystones A.F.C.
 Tolka Rovers F.C.
 Home Farm F.C.
 Wayside Celtic F.C.

Ulster

Byes:
 Bonagee United
 Swilly Rovers F.C.
 Fanad United

Second round
The Second Round was also regionalised, so teams from the Munster Senior League played each other, teams from the Leinster Senior League played each other and teams from the Ulster Senior League played each other on a knockout basis. The draw was made on 4 October with games played on 20,21,22 and 23 October 2016.

Munster

Leinster

Ulster

Third round
The Third Round was not regionalised, so teams from the Munster Senior League, Leinster Senior League, and Ulster Senior League all played each other on a knockout basis. The draw was made on 1 November with games played on or before 27 November 2016.

Fourth round

References

5
5
FAI Intermediate Cup